"Rame" is a 1996 song by German Eurodance project Snap!, released as the fourth and final single from their third studio album, Welcome to Tomorrow (1994). It features vocals by Indian vocalist Neela Ravindra credited under the alias "Rukmani", and was a top 30 hit in the Netherlands and Belgium and a top 40 hit in Austria, Germany and Sweden. Its accompanying music video was directed by Angel, who had previously directed several videos for Snap!.

Critical reception
Alan Jones from Music Week wrote, "The most consistent Euro act of the past few years, Snap! are back with the oddly-titled "Rame", an excellent song on which they venture into the ethnic dance arena inhabited by Deep Forest and Enigma. A throbbing dance beat overlaid with softer tones provide the backing to a wailing exotic female vocalist. A deserved hit." James Hyman from the RM Dance Update rated it four out of five. He added, "Well-layered and exceedingly well-produced slice of Teutonic trance with Eastern wailing residing harmoniously over a fast bpm-ed backing and 'Moments in Love'-ish notes. The slomo version could practically pass as an 'Im Nin' Alu' for the Nineties and a mix from Resistance D toughens everything into dubby hard Euro-house. Already doing well around Europe, this deserves to succeed."

Track listing

 7" single, Germany (1996)
"Rame" (Original Version) – 3:54
"Rame" (Slomo Version) – 4:01

 12", Germany (1996)
"Rame" (12" Extended) – 5:50
"Rame" (Resistance D. Remix) – 7:22

 CD single, Germany (1996)
"Rame" (Original Version) – 3:54
"Rame" (Slomo Version) – 4:01

 CD single, UK (1996)
"Rame" (Original Version) – 3:57
"Rame" (Slomo Version) – 4:04
"Rame" (Resistance D. Remix) – 7:20
"Rame" (80% Stereo Mix) – 6:17

 CD maxi, Germany (1996)
"Rame" (Original Version) – 3:54
"Rame" (Slomo Version) – 4:01
"Rame" (Resistance D. Remix) – 7:22
"Rame" (80% Stereo Mix) – 6:17

Charts

References

Snap! songs
1996 songs
1996 singles
Ariola Records singles
Arista Records singles
Electro songs
Music videos directed by Angel (director)